Kenneth Mendonca is an American politician. He is a former State Representative in the Rhode Island House of Representatives.

Elections
In 2015, Mendonca ran for Rhode Island State Senate District 11. He lost the primary to John Pagliarini, coming in second. In 2016, Mendonca ran for the State House. He won the Republican primary, then won the general election over (D) Linda Dill Finn. In 2018, he lost his bid for reelection to Terri Denise Cortvriend. In 2019, he dropped out of the race for state chair of the GOP.

References 

 https://ballotpedia.org/Kenneth_Mendonca

Year of birth missing (living people)
Living people
Republican Party members of the Rhode Island House of Representatives
People from Portsmouth, Rhode Island